The 2022 Arkansas Secretary of State election took place on November 8, 2022, to elect the Secretary of State of Arkansas. Incumbent Republican John Thurston won re-election to a second term.

Republican primary

Candidates

Declared
John Thurston, incumbent secretary of state (since 2018)

Eliminated in primary 
Eddie Joe Williams, former member of the Arkansas Senate (2011–2017)

Withdrew
Mark Lowery, member of the Arkansas House of Representatives from the 39th district (since 2013) (running for state treasurer)

Polling

Results

Democratic primary

Candidates

Declared
Anna Beth Gorman, executive director of the Women's Foundation of Arkansas

Eliminated in primary 
Josh Price, former Pulaski County election commissioner

Polling

Results

General election

Debate 
A debate was held on October 25.

Predictions

Results

Notes

References

External links
Official campaign websites
Anna Beth Gorman (D) for Secretary of State
John Thurston (R) for Secretary of State

Secretary of State
Arkansas